Life! is a 2005 Dutch drama film directed by Willem van de Sande Bakhuyzen.

Cast 
 Monic Hendrickx as Anna
 Anne-Wil Blankers as Sybille
 Peter Blok as Paul
 Sarah Jonker as Robin
  as Isabelle
  as Jolande
  as Gregor
 Petra Laseur as Lies
  as Sybille (Age 20)
 Jeroen Krabbé as Hugo
 Jeroen Willems as Gerard
  as Ellie

References

External links 

2005 drama films
2005 films
Dutch drama films
2000s Dutch-language films